Barossa Reservoir is a reservoir in the Australian state of South Australia, built between 1899 and 1902 to supply water to Gawler and other northern country areas.

Location and features
The thin arch of the dam retaining wall, curved against the pressure of the water, was an innovation considered radical, and attracted the Reservoir international attention. It was featured in the Scientific American and caused the American Engineers News to remark that its "boldness of design deserves to rank with the most famous dams in the world". This unusual acoustic phenomenon is a popular tourist attraction, and has earned the dam the title "Whispering Wall" (see Whispering gallery).

During construction large stones were used in the wall to save concrete and tram rails were used to reinforce the upper section. The Barossa Reservoir was formed by damming the Yettie Creek gorge in the northern Mount Lofty Ranges, a feat that took over 400 men. Its water comes through a  tunnel, carved by horse power, from the South Para River and Reservoir, and is supplemented by the Warren Reservoir and the River Murray. In addition to Gawler and country, a filtration plant constructed in 1982 allows the Reservoir to supply the suburbs of Munno Para and Elizabeth.

The dam's vegetated surrounds are also protected. Aside from its acoustic attraction, the Whispering Wall offers great views of both the Barossa Reservoir and the surrounding, well-preserved natural bounty. The area abounds in thick scrub, tall red gums, and pines, and a flourishing bird and animal life. It is a popular destination for picnics and bird-watching.

In 2008, its engineering heritage was recognized by the installation of a marker provided by the Engineers Australia's Engineering Heritage Recognition Program.

Key statistics
Capacity: 
Length of wall: 
Height of wall: 
Depth at wall: 
Type of wall: Concrete arch

Incidents
 
At approximately 4:30 PM on Wednesday 21 April 2021, Henry Shepherdson jumped from the wall with his 9-month-old daughter, Kobi, strapped to him, amongst disturbed onlookers. The father was pronounced dead upon arrival of paramedics and the child later died at the scene. The incident was deemed a murder-suicide as there were witnesses who testify that Henry jumped as opposed to falling. There was a history of domestic violence between Kobi's mother and father.

Gallery

See also

List of reservoirs and dams in Australia

References

Barossa Valley
Reservoirs in South Australia
Recipients of Engineers Australia engineering heritage markers
Arch dams